Fíneamhain is an Irish language female given name.

Fíneamhain is a woman's name recorded in three instances in the 14th and 15th century Irish annals. The name is pronounced 'Fee-NAWN'.

In The Gaelic Names for Plants (Cameron) the word Fíneamhain translates as S. viminalis:

Bearers of the name

 Fíneamhain Ní Eogain, died 1387.
 Fíneamhain Ní Manchain, died 1419.
 Fíneamhain Ní Tomais, died 1446.

See also
List of Irish-language given names

References

External links
http://medievalscotland.org/kmo/AnnalsIndex/Feminine/Fineamhain.shtml
https://deriv.nls.uk/dcn23/7933/79334710.23.pdf

Irish-language feminine given names